"She Works Hard for the Money" is a song by American singer Donna Summer from her album She Works Hard for the Money (1983). The song was written by Michael Omartian and Summer, and produced by the former. It was released as the lead single in 1983 from the album by Mercury Records. It became a hit for Summer, reaching number one for a three-week stay atop the Billboard R&B singles chart (her first since 1979), number three on the Billboard Hot 100, and number three on the Billboard Dance Club Play chart. The single ended up as Billboards 15th-best performing song of 1983. In addition, Summer earned a nomination for Best Female Pop Vocal Performance at the 1984 Grammy Awards, where she performed the song live as the opening for the ceremony.

Background and composition
Co-written with Omartian, the song tells a story of a hard-working blue-collar woman. It was based on Summer's inspiration she had on the night of February 23–24, 1983, after the 25th Annual Grammy Awards ceremony when she attended an after-party at the West Hollywood restaurant Chasen's. Summer encountered a restroom attendant named Onetta Johnson who was exhausted from working long hours. Summer herself described the scene in December 1986 on the television program You Write the Songs: 

Summer quickly wrote down the title and presented it the next day at the house of her producer Omartian; he helped her flesh out the words and music, to become the final song written for the album. Johnson agreed to be photographed for the album's rear cover, standing in a diner with Summer, the two wearing matching waitress outfits. The first verse of the song starts "Onetta there in the corner stand".

The song is performed in the key of G minor in common time with a tempo of 136 beats per minute. Summer's vocals span from G3 to D5.

Reception
Cash Box said that the song has a "pumping bass line and steady rhythmic clip" and praised Summer's vocal performance.

Music video
The accompanying music video for the song, directed by Brian Grant, debuted on MTV and became the first video by an African American female artist to be placed in "heavy rotation" (a term used by MTV at the time to indicate a frequently-aired video). The video shows a woman, working as a waitress in a diner, who is burdened with many situations in her life such as work and raising two unruly children. It is also seen that she has abandoned her hopes of being a ballerina. Summer appears as an observer through a kitchen window, a woman who assists the fallen-down protagonist of the video, and, at the end, a leader of a troupe of women, in various work uniforms, who have taken to the streets to signify their independence and gain recognition for their "hard work". The protagonist is also seen dancing in the street with them.

In a parody of the image created by this song, and its cover art picture, Summer herself appears in the Frank Sinatra video for "L.A. Is My Lady", released in 1984, as a waitress who serves a patron and then wipes her brow.

There are two versions of the music video. One is the single edit; the other remains faithful to the original length of the album version of the song.

Charts

Weekly charts

Year-end charts

See also
List of number-one R&B singles of 1983 (U.S.)

References

1983 singles
1983 songs
Donna Summer songs
Mercury Records singles
American new wave songs
Post-disco songs
Song recordings produced by Michael Omartian
Songs written by Donna Summer
Songs written by Michael Omartian
Songs with feminist themes
Songs about labor